Fredrikstad Energi, branded as FEAS is a Norwegian power company that operates in Fredrikstad and Hvaler. The company is owned by the Municipality of Fredrikstad (51%) and Fortum (49%).

The company has bought a number of privatized power grid operators and power distribution companies in Norway, including Energi 1, Røyken Energiverk and Askøy Energi, as well as the now integrated Hvaler kommunale elverk. FEAS also is the largest owner of the Norwegian football premiership team Fredrikstad F.K. with 24% ownership.

Electric power companies of Norway
Companies based in Østfold
Companies formerly owned by municipalities of Norway
Fortum